The Hartford Hawks baseball team is the varsity intercollegiate baseball program of the University of Hartford, located in West Hartford, Connecticut. The program had been a member of the NCAA Division I America East Conference from 1985 to 2022. It has played home games at Fiondella Field since the venue opened at the start of the 2006 season.

History
The Hartford Art School, Hartt College of Music, and Hillyer College merged to create the University of Hartford in February 1957. It began operation for the 1957–1958 school year. Although some Hartford athletic programs, such as men's basketball, trace their history to the teams of Hillyer College, records for the baseball program begin with the 1958 season.

Division II
1958 was the program's first season of competition. It competed as a member of the NCAA College Division, made up of small-school athletic programs. Throughout the 1960s and 1970s, the program competed as an Independent and played a schedule of between ten and twenty games each season.

The program's first head coach, Frank Klein, served in the position for three seasons (1958–1960). The program had a losing record in each season, and Klein's overall record was 14–29. He later became the first commissioner of the Connecticut Collegiate Summer Baseball League.

In 1961, Roger Wickman became the program's second head coach. In his first season, the program had its first winning record, going 7–5 in 1961. In 20 seasons as head coach, Wickman had six total winning seasons and finished with a career record of 146-178-5. Following the 1980 season, he stepped down from the head coaching position to become an administrator in Hartford's athletic department.

During Wickman's tenure (following the 1973 season), the NCAA had reorganized its divisions. The large-school University Division became Division I, while the small-school College Division split to become Divisions II and III. Hartford, which had competed as a College Division Independent, became a Division II Independent. It continued to compete as an Independent through Wickman's final season as head coach in 1980.

In the 1980–1981 academic year, Hartford became a charter member of the Northeast-7 Conference, along with American International College, Assumption College, Bentley College, Bryant College, Springfield College, and Stonehill College. The league became known as the Northeast-8 Conference when Saint Anselm College joined for the 1981–1982 academic year. In four seasons (1981–1984) as a member of the conference, Hartford had an overall record of 11–61, including winless seasons in 1983 and 1984.

Division I
For the start of the 1984–1985 academic year, Hartford's athletic programs transitioned to Division I, joining the ECAC. For the 1985 season, the program's first in Division I, it hired former Major League Baseball player Bill Denehy as its head coach. That season, the team went 2–24. In 1986, Denehy's second season, the team's record improved slightly to 8–34. Denehy was fired during his third season for making inflammatory comments following a game against UConn in which two brawls broke out. Athletic director Don Cook, assisted by Wickman, coached the team for the remainder of the season.

Prior to the start of the 1988 season, Hartford hired Quinnipiac head coach Dan Gooley as a permanent replacement for Denehy. In Gooley's first season, the Hawks went 29–12 and finished second in the ECAC Tournament. In 1989, the team went 17–15–1 to give the program consecutive winning seasons for the first time since 1971–1972. In 1992, the team went 27–21 and finished second in the North Atlantic Conference (which sponsored its first season of baseball in 1990), again appearing in the ECAC Tournament.

In the late 1980s, future Major League Baseball player Jeff Bagwell played three seasons for the program. Recruited by Denehy, Bagwell played under him in 1987, then under Gooley from 1988 to 1989. In 400 at bats with the program, Bagwell's batting average was .413, a program record. Bagwell was drafted by the Boston Red Sox in the fourth round of the 1989 MLB Draft. He had a 15-year major league career with the Houston Astros in which he won a National League MVP Award and appeared in four All-Star Games.

Following the 1992 season, Gooley left Hartford to become a baseball corporate executive, and the program promoted assistant coach and former Major League player Moe Morhardt to replace him.  Morhardt held the position for two seasons (1993–1994), in which the program won at least 20 games per season and made consecutive NAC Tournament appearances. The team was eliminated in the opening round in the 1993 tournament. As the fifth seed in 1994, Hartford defeated fourth-seeded Maine in a best-of-three opening round. It then won its first two games in the double-elimination final round (5–1 against first-seeded Delaware and 6–5 against second-seeded Northeastern).  The team then lost consecutive games to Northeastern in the championship round, however, and finished as the tournament runner-up.  Morhardt resigned as head coach following the season.

UNC Asheville head coach Jim Bretz was hired to replace Morhardt, and Bretz held the position for three seasons (1995–1997). Under him, the program averaged only 16 wins per season and finished no higher than sixth in conference play.  It qualified for the 1996 NAC Tournament, in which it finished third.  Bretz resigned following the 1997 season "for personal reasons," according to the university.  Bob Nenna, one of Bretz's assistant coaches and a Hartford player from 1989 to 1992, led the team to a 13–32 record as interim head coach in 1998.  Future Major League player Earl Snyder played under Bretz and Nenna from 1995 to 1998.  Snyder set program career records for home runs (53) and runs batted in (173).  Snyder later played for both the Cleveland Indians and Boston Red Sox.

From 1999 to 2011, the program had a pair of head coaches whose career winning percentages were below .300.  Hartford hired Bowdoin and Falmouth Commodores head coach Harvey Shapiro for the start of the 1999 season.  In six seasons (1999–2004), Shapiro's head coaching record was 76-199-1.  Under him, the team finished no higher than sixth in conference play and did not qualify for an America East Tournament, which in 1998 had adopted a four-team format.  Shapiro resigned following the 2004 season.  Indiana assistant Jeff Calcaterra replaced Shapiro.  Calcaterra held the position from the start of the 2005 season until partway through the 2011 season, when he was fired with an overall record of 79-236-1. At the start of the 2006 season, Calcaterra's second season, the program opened Fiondella Field, the program's first on-campus venue since the mid-1980s.

To replace Calcaterra, the program hired UConn assistant Justin Blood for the 2012 season. Commenting on Blood's hiring, Aaron Fitt of Baseball America called him "one of the top up-and-coming coaches in the Northeast." In both 2012 and 2013, Blood's first two seasons as head coach, the Hawks finished in fifth place in the America East.  In 2014, Hartford went 31–23, finishing second in the America East; pitcher Sean Newcomb was named the America East Pitcher of the Year.  The team qualified for the conference tournament, where the team went 1–2.  It was Hartford's first winning season since 1992 and first postseason appearance since 1996.  Following the season, three Hawks were selected in the 2014 Major League Baseball Draft, including Newcomb, who was selected in the first round by the Los Angeles Angels.  Newcomb was Hartford's highest draft pick ever, and the three draftees were the program's first since 2004.  Following the season, Blood signed a five-year contract extension through the 2019 season.

Division III
On May 6, 2021, the University of Hartford Board of Regents voted to drop its athletic department to Division III. The drop is set to take place no later than September 1, 2025.

Conference affiliations
 Independent (College Division/Division II) (1958–1980)
 Northeast-8 Conference (Division II) (1981–1984)
 Known as the Northeast-7 Conference in 1981
 Eastern Collegiate Athletic Conference (Division I) (1985–1989)
 America East Conference (Division I) (1990–2022)
 Known as the North Atlantic Conference from 1990 to 1996
 Independent (College Division/Division I) (2023)

Venues

Early venues
In its early years as a Division II program, Hartford played home games on campus.  It began to use off-campus venues in the mid-1980s.  These venues included New Britain's Beehive Field, Bristol's Muzzy Field, East Hartford's Ray McKenna Field, and Simsbury's Memorial Field.

Fiondella Field

Since it opened at the start of the 2006 season, on-campus Fiondella Field has been the program's home. It has a seating capacity of 1,000 spectators and an artificial turf surface.

Dunkin' Donuts Park

Opened in 2017 Dunkin' Donuts Park has served as Hartford's second home stadium in downtown Hartford with a seating capacity of 6,056.

Year-by-year records
Below is a table of the program's yearly records as both a Division II and Division I program.
{| class="wikitable"

|- align="center"

|-style="background: #ffffdd;"
| colspan="8" align="center" | Division I

Awards

Conference awards
America East Coach of the Year-Justin Blood (2018)

All-Americans
 Nicholas Dombkowski
 Nick Campana
 Sean Newcomb

MLB Draft

Baseball Hall of Fame

Notes

References

External links
 Official website